Evolusi KL Drift 2 (Literal translation: KL Drift Evolution 2) is a 2010 Malaysian Malay-language action film. It is the sequel to the 2008 film Evolusi KL Drift. The film was released in Malaysia, Singapore and Brunei on 25 March 2010.

Plot
Racing life between Zack (Syamsul Yusof) and Sham (Farid Kamil) has not ended yet. Zack, who used to be an illegal racer is currently a professional drifter. After the accident, Sham no longer drifts due to his broken leg and has to walk using the aid of crutches. Soon a female professional drifter called Aleeya (Scha Al-Yahaya) appears. Joe (Aaron Aziz), who managed to escape unhurt from the accident, wants revenge on Zack. Joe's assistant Ery (Shaheizy Sam) also wants revenge on Zack because he caused his best friend, Karl (played by Iqram Dinzly in the prequel) to get locked up in jail. Joe wants to control the whole drug business syndicate in KL, and ASP Kamal (Remy Ishak) suspects him for the crimes that involved deaths. What is the outcome of their new race this time? Will they be able to reach the finish line without complication?

Cast
 Syamsul Yusof as Zack
 Farid Kamil as Sham
 Scha Alyahya as Aleya
 Aaron Aziz as Joe
 Shaheizy Sam as Ery
 Remy Ishak as ASP Kamal
 Buzen Hashim as Zul
 Hetty Sarlene as Vee
 Rizal Ashraf as Muz
 Adam Corrie as Alex
 Zul Ariffin as ASP Zam

References

External links
 

2010 action films
2010 films
Malay-language films
Malaysian auto racing films
Cantonese-language Malaysian films
Malaysian action films
Malaysian sequel films
Films directed by Syamsul Yusof
Films produced by Yusof Haslam
Skop Productions films
Grand Brilliance films
Films with screenplays by Syamsul Yusof